Jamal Al Sharif (born 8 December 1954) is a retired football referee from Damascus, Syria. He is mostly known for supervising six matches in the FIFA World Cup. Two matches in 1986, one in 1990 and three in 1994, including the second round match between Bulgaria and Mexico. He also supervised a single game between Argentina and Ivory Coast in 1992 King Fahd Cup, The first edition of FIFA Confederations Cup in Saudi Arabia. He also officiated at the 1988 Olympics.

He worked for beIN Sports channels as an analyst from the opening of the channel in 2003 until 2020.

External links
 Jamal Al Sharif at WorldFootball.net

1954 births
Living people
Sportspeople from Damascus
Syrian football referees
FIFA World Cup referees
1990 FIFA World Cup referees
1994 FIFA World Cup referees
1986 FIFA World Cup referees
Olympic football referees
AFC Asian Cup referees